Henry Pooley & Son Ltd was a mechanical engineering company specialising in the manufacture of weighing machines. It was based in Liverpool and later in Birmingham, England.

The company was absorbed into W & T Avery. An example of the company's weighing machines can be found on Platform 2 of Ipswich railway station in Suffolk.

Another example of the companies weighing machine can be seen in Ezhukone Railway station, Kerala, India, which is a part of the kollam-Sengottai section of Indian Railways. The machine is still functional and is used even today. The Kollam–Sengottai section is part of the Kollam–Chennai metre-gauge rail route commissioned by the British in 1904.

Another example of the companies railway engine weighing scales can be found in the grounds of the Queen Victoria Museum and Art Gallery in Launceston, Tasmania, Australia.

Another example of the companies agricultural weighing scales in its original position can be found in the grounds of Cragend Farm, Northumberland England United Kingdom.

Another example of the companies engine weighing equipment can be found at the Surrey Hills Community Centre on Union Road, Surrey Hills, Melbourne, Victoria, Australia.

An Locomotive Balancing Table made for the Victorian Railways in 1912 can be found at the Newport Workshops in Melbourne, Australia. It is operational and used regularly to weigh & balance steam locomotives by Steamrail Victoria.

References

External links
Henry Pooley and Son Limited at the National Museum of Science & Industry

Engineering companies of England
Defunct companies based in Liverpool
Defunct companies based in Birmingham, West Midlands
Defunct manufacturing companies of England
Manufacturing companies based in Birmingham, West Midlands
Manufacturing companies based in Liverpool